41 Union is a trolleybus line operated by the San Francisco Municipal Railway (Muni). It connects South of Market, the Financial District, Chinatown, North Beach, Russian Hill, and Cow Hollow.

Route description
From the outbound terminus at Lyon and Greenwich, buses run east on Union Street until Columbus Avenue where the route turns south. A short segment of the outbound route runs on Stockton Street turning between Columbus and Union. At the foot of Columbus, the route follows a complicated route on one-way streets to the inbound terminal at Main and Howard before returning to Columbus again on one-way streets.

History
The city purchased the Presidio & Ferries Railway's Union Street Line in 1913, as the route was one of four planned in anticipation of the 1915 Panama–Pacific International Exposition. The E Union opened as a streetcar route ten days before the fair, running from the Ferry Building to the Presidio via The Embarcadero, Washington/Jackson, Columbus, Union, Larkin, Vallejo, Franklin, Union, Baker and Greenwich into the Presidio.

Streetcar service was discontinued and the E Union was merged into the R Howard trolleybus line on July 20, 1947, becoming the E Union–Howard. It was re-designated the 41 Union/Howard in February 1949.

When Howard became a one-way street in 1970, the route was split in two, with the northern alignment retaining the 41 Union designation while the southern end became the 12 Folsom/Pacific. The 41 was reduced to rush-hour service on October 1, 1988. Services were discontinued in 2020 amid the COVID-19 pandemic.

References

Bibliography

External links
 41 Union — via SFMTA

San Francisco Municipal Railway trolleybus routes